A. Asokaraj was an Indian politician and former Member of Parliament elected from Tamil Nadu. He was elected to the Lok Sabha from Perambalur constituency as an Anna Dravida Munnetra Kazhagam candidate in 1977, 1989 and 1991 elections.

References 

All India Anna Dravida Munnetra Kazhagam politicians
Living people
India MPs 1977–1979
India MPs 1989–1991
India MPs 1991–1996
Lok Sabha members from Tamil Nadu
People from Perambalur district
Year of birth missing (living people)